Roosevelt (historically known as Greenwich and Rum Point) is a hamlet and census-designated place (CDP) in the Town of Hempstead in Nassau County, on the South Shore of Long Island, in New York, United States. The population was 18,066 at the 2020 census.

History
The community is named for former President Theodore Roosevelt, but was also known as Greenwich and Rum Point for a time before that. While Roosevelt once had a predominantly-white population, white flight and real estate blockbusting became a major issue during the postwar housing boom in the 1950s and 1960s, when the community saw an influx of African-American residents.

Geography

Demographics

2020 census

Note: the US Census treats Hispanic/Latino as an ethnic category. This table excludes Latinos from the racial categories and assigns them to a separate category. Hispanics/Latinos can be of any race.

2010 census 
As of the census of 2010, there were 16,258 people residing in the CDP. The racial makeup of the CDP was 13.90% White, 63.11% African American, 0.79% Native American, 0.56% Asian, 0.07% Pacific Islander, 17.02% from other races, and 4.54% from two or more races. Hispanic or Latino of any race were 34.12% of the population.

Census 2000 
As of the census of 2000, there were 15,854 people, 4,061 households, and 3,362 families residing in the CDP. The population density was 3,438.9/km2 (8,916.8/mi2). There were 4,234 housing units at an average density of 918.4/km2 (2,381.3/mi2). The racial makeup of the CDP was 3.97% White, 79.02% African American, 0.46% Native American, 0.49% Asian, 0.05% Pacific Islander, 8.33% from other races, and 3.69% from two or more races. Hispanic or Latino of any race were 16.22% of the population.

There were 4,061 households, out of which 38.3% had children under the age of 18 living with them, 44.2% were married couples living together, 30.3% had a female householder with no husband present, and 17.2% were non-families. 12.0% of all households were made up of individuals, and 4.1% had someone living alone who was 65 years of age or older. The average household size was 3.88 and the average family size was 3.98.

In the CDP, the population was spread out, with 30.5% under the age of 18, 9.7% from 18 to 24, 30.8% from 25 to 44, 20.9% from 45 to 64, and 8.1% who were 65 years of age or older. The median age was 32 years. For every 100 females, there were 88.8 males. For every 100 females age 18 and over, there were 84.4 males.

The median income for a household in the CDP was $56,715, and the median income for a family was $56,380. Males had a median income of $30,694 versus $29,566 for females. The per capita income for the CDP was $16,950. About 10.8% of families and 15.0% of the population were below the poverty line, including 20.1% of those under age 18 and 14.2% of those age 65 or over.

Education

The majority of Roosevelt is located within the boundaries of (and is thus served by) the Roosevelt Union Free School District. However, small portions of the hamlet's southwestern and southeastern corners are located within the boundaries of (and thus served by) the Baldwin Union Free School District and the Freeport Union Free School District, respectively. As such, children who reside within Roosevelt and attend public schools go to school in one of these three districts depending on where they live within the hamlet.

Additionally, the portion of the Meadowbrook State Parkway within the hamlet is located within the Merrick UFSD, the North Merrick UFSD, and the Bellmore–Merrick Central High School District. However, no homes in the hamlet are located in these areas.

Notable people
 David Ancrum (born 1958), basketball player, top scorer in the 1994 Israel Basketball Premier League
Gabriel Casseus, actor and screenwriter
Chuck D and Flavor Flav, hip hop artists
Sandra Dee, actress
Julius "Dr. J" Erving, former professional basketball player
Roy Haynes, jazz drummer
John Mackey, National Football League Hall of Fame member
Miff Mole, trombonist
Charlie Murphy, comedian/actor
Eddie Murphy, comedian/actor
Arvell Shaw, jazz bassist
Howard Stern, radio personality
Sabrina N. Thompson, aerospace engineer
Steve White, actor

References

Further reading
Rosalyn Baxandall and Elizabeth Ewen, Picture windows: how the suburbs happened, New York, NY: Basic Books, 2000.
Andrew Wiese, Places of their own: African American suburbanization in the twentieth century, Chicago: University of Chicago Press, 2004.
Marquita L. James, Blacks in Roosevelt, Long Island New York, ca. 1985.

Hempstead, New York
Census-designated places in New York (state)
Census-designated places in Nassau County, New York